Algeria competed at the 2018 Mediterranean Games in Tarragona, Catalonia, Spain over 10 days from 22 June to 1 July 2018. In this session, Algeria  participated with 233 athletes in 24 sports, the second largest participation after the Algeria Games in 1975. After a little late over an hour flight, the special plane that transported the Algerian delegation landed on the tarmac of the regional Airport of Reus, Catalonia. The first wave of the Algerian delegation, 144 people including 67 athletes, 7 referees, 8 COA members, 10 medical staff and journalists. The first medal in the games was in karate by Oualid Bouabaoub in bronze weight −75 kg kumite, is the only one on the first day, The first gold medal was awarded to Hocine Daïkhi in Karate, also weighing +84 kg kumite, then in the evening the swimmer Oussama Sahnoune achieved the second Golden Medal of the 100 m freestyle, the first of its kind in swimming since Almería 2005. On the third day, Sahnoune managed to add a second medal in his 50 m freestyle of silver, the first for Algeria of this type in this games. In Wrestling Greco-Roman, Algeria achieved two silver medals for Bachir Sid Azara in −87 kg and Adem Boudjemline in −97 kg after losing in the final against both Metehan Başar and Mélonin Noumonvi respectively.

Medal summary

Medal table

|  style="text-align:left; width:78%; vertical-align:top;"|

|  style="text-align:left; width:22%; vertical-align:top;"|

Archery 

Men

Women

Athletics 

Six Algerian athletes have achieved the minima of participation in the next Mediterranean Games.

Men
Track & road events

Women
Track & road events

Field events

Badminton 

The Algerian badminton will be represented by 8 athletes in Tarragona including four girls, but in the absence of the best Algerian player, Hala Bouksani, who passes her baccalaureate.

Men

Women

Bowls 

Lyonnaise

Pétanque

Raffa

Boxing 

Men

Canoeing

Slalom

Sprint

Cycling

Equestrian 

It is composed of five riders who have distinguished themselves in competitions at the national level, under the leadership of the French coach Guillaume Blin Lebreton, they are Brahim Ait Lounis, Mahi Amine, Boughrab Ali, Abdelkrim Benbernou and the young rider Manon Hebette who lives in France and remains on good performances this season.

Fencing 

Men

Football

Team

Redouane Maachou
Aek Alaa Eddine Belharrane
Mohamed Amine Tougai
Ahmed Mohamed Kerroum
Aïssa Boudechicha
Aymen Mohammed Belaribi
Abdelkahar Kadri
Karam Hamdad
Hmida Zeghnoun
Adem Zorgane
Brahim Hachoud
Mohamed Amine Baghdaoui
Zerroug Boucif
Merouane Zerrouki
Karim Chaban
Ishak Boussouf
Wassim Aouachria
Idir Boutrif

Group A
The draw took place on May 10 and Algeria signed in the group A with hosts Spain and Bosnia and Herzegovina.

Fifth place match

Handball

Men's tournament

Preliminary round
Group B

Quarterfinal

5–8th place semifinals

Seventh place game

Judo

Karate 

Men

Women

Rowing 

Qualification Legend: FA=Final A (medal); FB=Final B (non-medal); R=Repechage

Sailing 

The athletes selected for the 2018 MG are Hamza Bouras and Meriem Rezouani (RSX), Wassim Ziatni and Nouha Akil (Laser) under the guidance of coaches Fayçal Merzougui (Laser) and Abdenasser Goudjil (RSX).
Men

Women

M = Medal race; EL = Eliminated – did not advance into the medal race

Shooting 

Men

Women

Swimming 

For this Mediterranean event, the Algerian Swimming Federation (FAN) has selected 10 swimmers including five girls. They are supervised by three coaches: Ali Maânsri, Abdelkahar Kouhil and the French Olivier Barnier.
Men

Women

Table tennis

Taekwondo

Tennis 

Six tennis players (2 men and 2 ladies) will represent Algeria at the Mediterranean Games in Tarragona.
Men

Women

Triathlon

Volleyball

Beach

Indoor
Men's tournament

Women's tournament

Weightlifting 

Men

Women

Wrestling 

Algeria will participate in only eight male wrestlers.
Men's Freestyle

Women's Freestyle

Men's Greco-Roman

References

Nations at the 2018 Mediterranean Games
2018
Mediterranean Games